A singing candle is an electro-acoustic installation. The movements of a candle flame are transformed into sound by means of a light dependent resistor (LDR). The sound waves, in return, have an influence on the flame, through an amplifier and loudspeaker, forming a feedback loop.

See also
 Rubens tube

References

Acoustics